Volume 1 of the Association of Radio Industries and Businesses (ARIB) STD-B24 standard for Broadcast Markup Language specifies, amongst other details, a character encoding for use in Japanese-language broadcasting.

It includes a number of  not found in the base standards (JIS X 0208 and JIS X 0201). It was the source standard for many symbol characters which were added to Unicode, including portions of the Miscellaneous Symbols, Enclosed Alphanumeric Supplement and Enclosed Ideographic Supplement blocks. Its contributions partially overlap the Unicode emoji, but were added a year earlier, in Unicode 5.2.

Fascicle 1 of the ARIB STD-B62 standard, published in 2014, defines Unicode mappings for a selection of the B24 extended characters (excluding, for example, those duplicated by JIS X 0213), as well as a few extended Kanji. It also includes a mapping of utilised characters outside the Basic Multilingual Plane to the BMP's private use area.

Sets and codes 

The ARIB STD B24 standard defines multiple character sets and a method of switching between them. These include a Kanji set (an extension of JIS X 0208), an Alphanumeric set, a Hiragana set, Katakana sets of two distinct layouts and four mosaic sets. The sets are selected using ISO 2022 mechanisms for 94-sets, using the following codes (proportional sets use the same layout as the corresponding non-proportional ones):

Code charts

Kanji (double-byte) set 
This is a double-byte character set extending JIS X 0208.

Lead byte 
The encoding bytes correspond to the row or cell number plus 0x20, or 32 in decimal (see below). Hence, the code set starting with 0x21 has a row number of 1, and its cell 1 has a continuation byte of 0x21 (or 33), and so forth. Most of the code corresponds to JIS X 0208.

Character sets 0x21-0x74 (row numbers 1-84: punctuation, alphabets, numbers, Kana, Kanji)

Character set 0x7A (row number 90, traffic symbols) 
Characters 90-45 through 90-63 and 90-66 through 90-84 (shown below shaded) are listed in the B24 standard only in table 7-10 (the list of extension characters), and are also the only characters in rows 90 through 91 which are not transport-related symbols; this is noted in the B24 standard in an endnote to table 7-10. The remainder of the extensions are listed in both table 7-4 (the double-byte code chart) and table 7-10.

Character set 0x7B (row number 91, map symbols) 

Characters from ARIB STD-B24 which were not retained in ARIB STD-B62 are shown shaded.

Character set 0x7C (row number 92, units, enclosed forms, list markers, arrows) 
Characters from ARIB STD-B24 which were not retained in ARIB STD-B62 are shown shaded.

Character set 0x7D (row number 93, game and weather symbols, fractions, units, enclosed forms) 
Characters from ARIB STD-B24 which were not retained in ARIB STD-B62 are shown shaded.

Character set 0x7E (row number 94, list markers) 
Characters from ARIB STD-B24 which were not retained in ARIB STD-B62 are shown shaded.

Single-byte sets

Alphanumeric set

Hiragana set

Katakana set

JIS X 0201 Katakana set

Mosaic sets

Shift_JIS variant 
In addition to the modified ISO 2022 encoding, the B24 standard also specifies a Shift JIS encoding following JIS X 0208:1997, but with the addition of the extended characters in the kanji set.

See also

Footnotes

References

Further reading 
 
  (NB. Translated into Japanese and Chinese in 2002.)

External links
 Official changelog for ARIB STD-B24 
 STD-B24 and others, List of ARIB Standards in the Field of Broadcasting (ARIB)

Character sets
Encodings of Japanese